Swab may refer to:
 Nasopharyngeal swab
 Cotton swab
 A nautical term for a yarn mop
By extension, a low-ranking sailor